Pebbles is the plural form of the word "pebble".

Pebbles may also refer to:

People
 Pebbles (radio personality) (born 1964), Boston-area radio DJ
 Anthony Rocca (born 1977), Australian rules footballer commonly referred to as "Pebbles"
 Pebbles (musician) (Perri Reid, born 1964), American dance-pop and urban contemporary singer-songwriter

Fictional characters
 Pebbles Flintstone, a character in The Flintstones animated television show

Groups and organizations
 The Pebbles, a Belgian rock band active 1965–1974
 Pebbles Project, a humanitarian project in South Africa

Music
 Pebbles (series), dozens of albums of 1960s garage rock music compiled and released by AIP and BFD Records from the late 1970s to the mid-2000s 
 Pebbles (Pebbles album), 1987 by Pebbles (Perri Reid)

Other uses
 Pebbles (horse) (1981–2005), British-trained thoroughbred racehorse of the 1980s
Pebbles cereal, a sweetened rice cereal featuring a Flintstones theme, named after the fictional character "Pebbles Flintstone"
 "Pebbles", an episode of the television series Teletubbies

See also

 Pebble (disambiguation)
 Peebles (disambiguation)